"Almost Persuaded" is a song written by  Glenn Sutton and Epic Records producer Billy Sherrill and first recorded by David Houston in 1966.  It is not to be confused with the Christian hymn of the same name.

Content
The song is about a married man who, while patronizing a tavern, sees a beautiful young woman and is instantly smitten. Forgetting that he is married, he nearly succumbs to temptation. However, when the two share a slow dance, he notices a reflection of his wedding ring literally in her eyes and, remembering his vows to his wife, leaves.

Legacy
"Almost Persuaded" spent nine weeks at No. 1 on the Billboard Hot Country Singles chart starting in August 1966 and has since gone on to become a country standard. The song was also a moderate pop hit, reaching twenty-four on the Billboard pop chart and was David Houston's only top 40 entry on the pop charts.

For 46 years and two months, no No. 1 song matched the chart-topping longevity of "Almost Persuaded," until Taylor Swift's "We Are Never Ever Getting Back Together" notched its ninth week atop the Billboard Hot Country Songs chart the week of December 15, 2012.

The song won a Grammy Award for Best Country & Western Recording of 1966.

Other versions
Later in 1966, singer-comedian Sheb Wooley, performing as Ben Colder, released a parody versiontitled "Almost Persuaded No. 2." Here, an already-drunk man enters a barroom, sits down at a table and attempts to make conversation with a young woman seated there. The two dance briefly until the woman's boyfriend steps in and makes the man leave.

Colder's version reached No. 6 on the Hot Country Singles chart and No. 58 on the Billboard Hot 100.

Some cover versions of the original song include:
 Crispian St. Peters released a cover of the song on his 1966 album Follow Me. It reached #52 on the UK Singles Chart in 1967.
 The Statler Brothers in 1966
 George Jones in 1983
 Merle Haggard in 1986
 Tammy Wynette in 1967, who coincidentally recorded a number of duets with Houston
 Patti Page in 1966
 Charlie Rich in 1974
 Tanya Tucker in 1977
 Hank Williams, Jr. in 1990
 Johnny Paycheck in 1968
 Tennessee Ernie Ford
 Lefty Frizzell
 Bill Haley
 Etta James
 Louis Armstrong
 Pozo-Seco Singers in 1967
 Country Teasers
 Beth Rowley
 Faron Young, appearing on numerous Faron Young greatest hits compilations and various artist compilations
 Hootenanny Singers made a Swedish version "Början till slutet" in 1967. Swedish lyrics by Stig Anderson aka Stikkan Anderson
 Ragnar Bjarnason recorded the tune in 1968 with Icelandic Lyrics as "Hafið lokkar og laðar".

Charts

David Houston

Patti Page

Ben Colder ("Almost Persuaded No. 2")

Etta James

Merle Haggard

References

1966 singles
1969 singles
1987 singles
Songs written by Glenn Sutton
Songs written by Billy Sherrill
David Houston (singer) songs
The Statler Brothers songs
Crispian St. Peters songs
George Jones songs
Merle Haggard songs
Tammy Wynette songs
Patti Page songs
Charlie Rich songs
Tanya Tucker songs
Tennessee Ernie Ford songs
Bill Haley songs
Etta James songs
Sheb Wooley songs
Hank Williams Jr. songs
Billboard Hot Country Songs number-one singles of the year
Song recordings produced by Billy Sherrill
Epic Records singles
1966 songs